Neşe is a Turkish feminine given name. People named Neşe include:
 Neşe Aybey (1930-2015), Turkish miniaturist
 Neşe Erberk (born 1964), Turkish businesswoman
 Nese Erdok (born 1940), Turkish painter
 Neşe Karaböcek (born 1947), Turkish singer
 Neşe Mercan (born 1994), Turkish Paralympian goalball player
 Neşe Şensoy Yıldız (born 1974), Turkish judoka
 Neşe Yaşın (born 1959), Turkish Cypriot writer
 Neşe Zara Yılmaz, Turkish folk music singer and actress

Turkish feminine given names